Corythus is the name of six mortal men in Greek mythology.

Corythus, son of Marmarus, and one of the court of Cepheus. He wounded Pelates during the battle at the wedding feast of Perseus and Andromeda.
Corythus, an Italian king and father, in some sources, of Iasion and Dardanus by Electra.
Corythus, one of the Lapiths. Only a youth, he was killed nonetheless by Rhoetus, one of the Centaurs.
Corythus, an Iberian, beloved of Heracles. Was said to have been the first to devise a helmet (Greek korys, gen. korythos), which took its name from him.
Corythus, one of the Doliones. He was killed by Tydeus.
Corythus, a king who raised Telephus, son of Heracles and Auge, as his own son.
Corythus, son of Paris and the nymph Oenone. After Paris abandoned Oenone, she sent the boy, now grown, to Troy, where he fell in love with Helen, and she received him warmly. Paris, discovering this, killed him, not recognizing his own son. Corythus was also said to have been, instead, the son of Helen and Paris.

Notes

References 

 Diodorus Siculus, The Library of History translated by Charles Henry Oldfather. Twelve volumes. Loeb Classical Library. Cambridge, Massachusetts: Harvard University Press; London: William Heinemann, Ltd. 1989. Vol. 3. Books 4.59–8. Online version at Bill Thayer's Web Site
 Diodorus Siculus, Bibliotheca Historica. Vol 1-2. Immanel Bekker. Ludwig Dindorf. Friedrich Vogel. in aedibus B. G. Teubneri. Leipzig. 1888-1890. Greek text available at the Perseus Digital Library.
 Gaius Valerius Flaccus, Argonautica translated by Mozley, J H. Loeb Classical Library Volume 286. Cambridge, MA, Harvard University Press; London, William Heinemann Ltd. 1928. Online version at theio.com.
 Gaius Valerius Flaccus, Argonauticon. Otto Kramer. Leipzig. Teubner. 1913. Latin text available at the Perseus Digital Library.
 Maurus Servius Honoratus, In Vergilii carmina comentarii. Servii Grammatici qui feruntur in Vergilii carmina commentarii; recensuerunt Georgius Thilo et Hermannus Hagen. Georgius Thilo. Leipzig. B. G. Teubner. 1881. Online version at the Perseus Digital Library.
 Parthenius, Love Romances translated by Sir Stephen Gaselee (1882-1943), S. Loeb Classical Library Volume 69. Cambridge, MA. Harvard University Press. 1916.  Online version at the Topos Text Project.
 Parthenius, Erotici Scriptores Graeci, Vol. 1. Rudolf Hercher. in aedibus B. G. Teubneri. Leipzig. 1858. Greek text available at the Perseus Digital Library.
 Publius Ovidius Naso, Metamorphoses translated by Brookes More (1859-1942). Boston, Cornhill Publishing Co. 1922. Online version at the Perseus Digital Library.
 Publius Ovidius Naso, Metamorphoses. Hugo Magnus. Gotha (Germany). Friedr. Andr. Perthes. 1892. Latin text available at the Perseus Digital Library.

Kings in Greek mythology
Male lovers of Heracles
Metamorphoses characters
Lapiths in Greek mythology